Red Hot Tires is a 1935 American crime drama film produced and distributed by Warner Bros., directed by D. Ross Lederman, and starring Lyle Talbot and Mary Astor. The plot involves a racing driver (Talbot) falsely accused of murdering a rival driver during a race and his friends' attempts to prove his innocence.

Plot summary

Cast
 Lyle Talbot as Wallace Storm
 Mary Astor as Patricia Sanford
 Roscoe Karns as Bud Keene
 Frankie Darro as Johnny
 Gavin Gordon as Robert Griffin
 Mary Treen as Maggie
 Henry Kolker as Martin Sanford
 Bradley Page as Curley Taylor
 Arthur Aylesworth as Race Judge Hanson
 Howard C. Hickman as Judge Alcott
 Clarence Muse as Bud's truck partner

Preservation status
A print of the film is preserved at the Library of Congress.

References

External list
 
 
 
 

1935 films
American auto racing films
Warner Bros. films
Films based on short fiction
Films directed by D. Ross Lederman
American crime drama films
1935 crime drama films
American black-and-white films
1930s English-language films
1930s American films